Denis Nikolayevich Boytsov (born 14 February 1986) is a Russian former professional boxer who competed from 2004 to 2015.

Amateur career
Boytsov has had a decorated amateur career, including the following accomplishments:

2001 won Cadet World Championship at Light Middleweight in Baku, Azerbaijan.
2002 won Cadet World Championship at Heavyweight in Kecskemet, Hungary.
2004 won Junior World Championship at Superheavyweight in Jeju, South Korea.

His record was 115-15.

Professional career
Boytsov turned pro in 2004 in Germany and won his first 20 bouts with 18 KO's. Later his opponents included Vincent Maddalone and Israel Carlos Garcia.

He has drawn comparisons to Mike Tyson in some circles with his aggressive crowd-pleasing style. He has exceptional punching power combined with fast hand speed.

On 3 May 2015 Boytsov was found unconscious in a Berlin subway tunnel. Due to a severe head injury he was placed in a medically induced coma for seven weeks, and will unlikely return to professional boxing. Ramzan Kadyrov agreed to cover Boytsov's medical bills after his banks accounts were blocked.

Boytsov lived in Germany for more than 10 years before the accident, which was initially related to his boxing activities, as he received multiple death threats in 2013. German court later ruled that Boytsov fell on tracks while being intoxicated.

Professional boxing record

References

External links

2002 results

1986 births
Living people
Sportspeople from Oryol
Russian male boxers
People with disorders of consciousness
People with traumatic brain injuries
Heavyweight boxers
Super-heavyweight boxers